Razdory is a rural locality (a khutor) in Mikhaylovka Urban Okrug, Volgograd Oblast, Russia. The population was 329 as of 2010. There are 7 streets.

Geography 
Razdory is located 67 km northeast of Mikhaylovka. Kukushkino is the nearest rural locality.

References 

Rural localities in Mikhaylovka urban okrug